Liz Cooper & The Stampede are a three-piece American rock band from Nashville, Tennessee. NPR describes their music as "a seamless balance of muted rhythmic sounds and propulsive drive that feels so good".

Overview 
Liz Cooper spent the majority of her life developing her golf skills, only to drop her college scholarship to move to Nashville and pursue music in 2012. Bottlerock Festival, Austin City Limits Festival, and have opened for Lord Huron, Phosphorescent, Tyler Childers, Houndmouth, Bermuda Triangle, Rayland Baxter, and Deer Tick. The band will play Newport Folk Festival, Forecastle Festival, Lockn' in summer 2019. When asked what types of music influences her she says "The '60s, '70s. Meeting people. My surroundings. Traveling. Jazz. Bossa nova. Random music that I'll hear when I'm driving through random places in Colorado where there's only one station, and it's really strange and I'm stuck with it. Everything influences me."

Reviews

 Glide Magazine says "This is special stuff, sending a clear as day signal that Liz Cooper & the Stampede may be one of the most exciting live acts out there right now."
 Natalie Weiner at New York Times writes "This lilting Nashville rock trio gives new meaning to the label “easy listening” with their tempered, dreamy psychedelia. Gentle grooves and softly arpeggiated guitars take the place of sprawling, climactic jams, yet their songwriting is taut enough that the audience is never in danger of being lulled to sleep."
 Bruce Warren at NPR writes “A gorgeously arranged and performed bouquet of psychedelia-tinged folk-rock...” “...to draw a line from Window Flowers to any period of rock and roll, it would be that of the Paisley Underground and bands like The Dream Syndicate, where beautiful and languid psychedelia met moody folk and rock based songs. Cooper taps into this and more on her debut, wrapping her reverbed vocals in swirling, warm echoes of sound and nuanced musical lushness thanks to the addition of keyboards, pedal steel, a glockenspiel here and a banjo there.”
 Jimmy Drenovsky from Mmarquettewire.org said, "Liz Cooper & the Stampede are a three-piece unit that make breathtaking ambient-rock tunes."
 NO COUNTRY-staff with NoCountryforNewNashville.com wrote, "We've had our eye on local psychedelic rockers Liz Cooper & The Stampede since they blew the roof off our Acme Feed & Seed showcase a while back."
 BNH at NPR.org related that "Mountain Man" is a catchy, simple love song written with the clarity of a good cut of Nashville country. Liz Cooper guides the song with her percussive, fingerpicked guitar and her crackling voice."

Discography

EPs

Albums

References

External links
  Official website

Musical groups from Nashville, Tennessee